Jax Anderson, formerly known as Flint Eastwood, is an alt pop musician from Detroit, Michigan. With wide-ranging influences from Spaghetti Westerns to Motown to mainstream dance pop, Anderson has built a reputation for her uncompromising style and high energy stage presence.

Jax Anderson formally announced a name change from Flint Eastwood. The musical project has undergone multiple transformations: Apple Trees and Tangerines (2008-2010), POWER (2010-2012), and Flint Eastwood (2012-2019). Anderson's music style is often described as "Spaghetti Western inspired".

Jax Anderson regularly tours the United States, performing in venues and music festivals of varying sizes.

History

Apple Trees & Tangerines 
Jax and Seth Anderson launched their joint music career as the band Apple Trees & Tangerines in 2008, along with former band members Ian Bacon, Jackleen Joseph, and Shane Nixon. In 2010, they won SESAC’s "College Battle of the Bands" in Las Vegas. That year, the Andersons informally released a 10-song EP, which included the singles "Can You Save Me" and "Sold My Soul (to the Radio)."

POWER 
In 2010, Jax and Seth Anderson moved to Los Angeles and renamed their band POWER. At this time, they formally released the single "Sold My Soul to the Radio" and provided the single "Can You Save Me" as the theme song for the USA Network drama Covert Affairs. While living in LA, POWER attempted to release one song weekly for an entire year, which Anderson titled, "52 in 52."

In 2011, POWER's song "The Perfect Match" was used in a commercial for Matching Donors, a nonprofit organization that helps organ transplant recipients find their a match.

Flint Eastwood 
After moving back to Detroit in 2012, Seth and Jax Anderson began their solo careers as Jax spearheaded Flint Eastwood and Seth began Sybling.

Flint Eastwood released Late Nights in Bolo Ties in 2013 led by the pre-EP release of the single "Billy The Kid" in 2012. This song was used in the trailer for the feature film To Write Love on Her Arms; she also provided "The Devil's Gun" for the film's soundtrack.

In 2015, after the death of her mother, Flint Eastwood released a reflective EP titled Small Victories. During this year, the musicians disbanded, making Jax Anderson a solo act, though she still used the Flint Eastwood moniker.

In 2016, Flint Eastwood collaborated with Gosh Pith, a Detroit-based indie rock band, to release the non-EP single, "Saviors." She was also featured on Seattle-based indie artist Manatee Commune's single "What We've Got."

After signing with Neon Gold Records, Flint Eastwood released the album Broke Royalty in 2017, which was accompanied by four music videos (i.e., "Queen," "Push," "Rewind," and "Monster"). Anderson's connection with Neon Gold brought about new opportunities, including playing at "Lollapalooza and Bonaroo. At the latter, she joined the annual "Superjam" to perform "Get Up Offa That Thing" by James Brown with Preservation Hall Jazz Band and Jon Batiste as her backing band and even sang back-up for Chance The Rapper during his "Hey Ya" re-work."

Also in 2017, Anderson co-founded Assemble Sound, "a collaboration studio space for local musicians to 'meet, find resources, and ultimately create good art.' Together they raised funds to purchase a church from the 1870’s [sic] and renovated it as a community [space."

The following year, Ford Motor Company used "Queen" and "Find What You're Looking For" to announce the released of the 2019 Mustang.

Jax Anderson openly entered the LGBT music community in June 2018 with her release "Real Love." That April, Flint Eastwood released a limited-edition merchandise line called Choose Empathy, which included a mug, t-shirt, pin, poster, and a camo fanny pack. A portion of the proceeds supported the Ruth Ellis Center, a residential safe space for runaway, homeless, and at-risk LGBTQ teens in Detroit.

In October, Anderson released of the 6-track EP The Handbook: (THIS IS a COPING MECHANISM FOR a BROKEN HEART) also referred to without 'The Handbook'. The songs were inspired by Jax's recent romantic breakup. Music videos were released for "Fire," "Hurt," and "Sober." The EP features other collaborators from Assemble Sound, including Shortly, Sienna Liggins, and Jay Prime.

In 2019, Flint Eastwood toured with Poppy on the "Poppy: Am I A Girl?" tour.

Jax Anderson 
Jax Anderson shed stage names in July 2019, formally announcing that she would perform under her birth name. Speaking with Jerilyn Jordan from the Detroit Metro Times, Anderson explained, 

In 2019, Anderson dropped the EP Heal, which includes the singles "Scared to Death," Fear," and "Hard Times." Along with other artists at Assemble Sound (i.e., Bre-Ann White, GOOD-PALS, Lansuh, Bakpak Durden, and Papier Tabloid), Anderson created six total music videos for this EP.

During the summer of 2020, Anderson began streaming previously unreleased music on Instagram and letting viewers choose which songs she should formally release. Through this practice, Anderson released six music videos (i.e., "The Train" featuring jackleendianaeve, "Baptize," "Too Many Cups of Coffee for One Night" featuring Keeks, "Modern Day Hymnal" & "FOCUS". This practice resulted in Bedroom B-Sides: Volume 1.

In 2020, Jax Anderson also collaborated with Yoke Lore to release "Sensitive Heart," as well as the accompanying music video.

The following year, Jax Anderson announced the release of a new EP, Songs for Every Condition, that included the "I Don't Care Anymore" (featuring K. Flay), "Good Day" (featuring MisterWives and Curtis Roach), and "The Wake Up Call." "Good Day" was used in a commercial for Halo Top Creamery.

Discography

Albums

Bedroom B-Sides: Volume 1 
During the summer of 2020, Anderson began streaming previously unreleased music on Instagram and letting viewers choose which songs she should formally release. Through this practice, Anderson released six music videos (i.e., "The Train" featuring jackleendianaeve, "Baptize," "Too Many Cups of Coffee for One Night" featuring Keeks, "Modern Day Hymnal" & "FOCUS". This practice resulted in Bedroom B-Sides: Volume 1.

Bedroom B-Sides was self-released and includes 12 tracks.

Songs for Every Condition 
Songs for Every Condition is an album project that Anderson pursued in 2021, wherein she regularly released singles and EPs connected to emotions (e.g., happy or tender). The full album was released October 8, 2021 with Neon Gold Records.

EPs

Singles

Music videos 
Before committing to her music full-time, Jax Anderson worked in film editing for five years. With this background experience, Anderson directs and edits most of her own music videos. She has also directed music videos for artists such as PVRIS, Matt Maeson, Andrew McMahon, Jagwar Twin, Ray Dalton, and Semler.

Personal life
Anderson is queer. The singer came out with the release of the single "Real Love," which was written after "her childhood pastor won an award for performing gay conversion therapy." When asked about the song-writing experience, Anderson stated, Some of my songs that I love the most have come from a place of frustration and angst... My whole life I was taught that if you follow Christianity you produce these things called the fruits of the spirit, which is love, joy, peace, patience, etc. You can have all these things – but not if you're gay. But I found all these things they said I couldn't find – I found them by being true to myself when I came out to everyone around me and told them, 'Yo, I'm extremely queer.' I found a lot of happiness in it, and I felt a lot of love and joy and acceptance and peace, just by being myself. Sometimes that's a really hard thing to do. So for me personally some of my best art comes from angst.

External links 

 Official Jax Anderson webpage

References

Sibling musical duos
Indie rock musical groups from Michigan
Musical groups from Detroit
Dew Process artists
American indie rock musicians
Queer musicians
American lesbian musicians
2010 establishments in Michigan